The following is a list of episodes for the Magical Girls Lyrical Nanoha anime franchise, which spawned from the Triangle Heart eroge series. The series follows a girl named Nanoha Takamachi who one day becomes a magical girl, facing off against various other magical foes throughout the series.

The first season, Magical Girl Lyrical Nanoha, was directed by Akiyuki Shinbo at Seven Arcs and aired in Japan between October 1, 2004 and December 24, 2004. The opening theme is "Innocent Starter" by Nana Mizuki while the ending theme is "Little Wish ~lyrical step~" by Yukari Tamura. The second season, Magical Girl Lyrical Nanoha A's, aired between October 1, 2005 and December 24, 2005, once again produced by Seven Arcs but now directed by Keizō Kusakawa. The opening theme is "Eternal Blaze" by Mizuki while the ending theme is "Spiritual Garden" by Tamura. Both Nanoha and Nanoha A's were released on DVD in North America by Geneon USA in May 2009. The third season, Magical Girl Lyrical Nanoha Strikers, aired in Japan between April 1, 2007 and September 24, 2007, once again directed by Kusakawa at Seven Arcs. The series is set ten years after the events of A's and introduces a new cast of characters joining the previous cast. The opening themes are "Secret Ambition" for episodes 1-17 and "Massive Wonders" for episodes 18 onwards, both performed by Mizuki.

An anime based on the Magical Girl Lyrical Nanoha ViVid manga series written by Masaki Tsuzuki aired in Japan between April 3, 2015 and June 19, 2015, directed by Yuuki Itoh at A-1 Pictures. Set four years after StrikerS, the series focuses on Nanoha's adopted daughter, Vivio Takamachi, as she participates in magical tournaments. The opening theme is "Angel Blossom" by Mizuki while the ending theme is "Pleasure Treasure" by Tamura. A spin-off series titled ViVid Strike!, directed by Junji Nishimura at Seven Arcs, aired in Japan between October 2, 2016 and December 17, 2016 and was simulcast in the United Kingdom by Amazon Video. The series focuses on a martial artist named Fuuka Reventon as she trains to become stronger. The opening theme is "Future Strike" by Yui Ogura while the ending theme is "Starry Wish" by Inori Minase.

Magical Girl Lyrical Nanoha series

Magical Girl Lyrical Nanoha (2004)

Magical Girl Lyrical Nanoha A's (2005)

Magical Girl Lyrical Nanoha StrikerS (2007)

Magical Girl Lyrical Nanoha ViVid series

Magical Girl Lyrical Nanoha ViVid (2015)

ViVid Strike! (2016)

Notes

References

Magical Girl Lyrical Nanoha
Episodes